Connecticut's 45th House of Representatives district elects one member of the Connecticut House of Representatives. It consists of the towns of Griswold, Sterling, Voluntown as well as parts of Lisbon and Plainfield. It has been represented by Republican Brian Lanoue since 2019.

Recent elections

2020

2018

2016

2014

2012

References

45